Zé Renato (born José Renato Botelho Moschkovich in Vitória, Espírito Santo, April 1, 1956) is a Brazilian singer, songwriter, and guitarist.

He has released many albums and his songs have been recorded by Milton Nascimento, Jon Anderson, Leila Pinheiro, Lulu Santos, Nana Caymmi, MPB-4, and Boca Livre.

Discography
 1981 - Fonte da Vida (Fountain of Life)
 1984 - Luz e mistério (Light and mystery)
 1988 - Pegadas (Footprints)
 1990 - Zil as a member of the band Zil
 1994 - Arranha Céu (Skyscraper)
 1995 - Natural do Rio de Janeiro
 1997 - A alegria continua
 1998 - Silvio Caldas 90 anos-Zé Renato e Orquestra
 1999 - Cabô
 2001 - Filosofia
 2002 - Memorial. Wagner Tiso e Zé Renato
 2003 - Minha praia
 2007 - Zé Renato - Ao vivo
 2008 - É tempo de amar

External links

Article about Zé Renato

Listening
Zé Renato page

1956 births
21st-century Brazilian male singers
21st-century Brazilian singers
People from Vitória, Espírito Santo
20th-century Brazilian male singers
20th-century Brazilian singers
Brazilian male guitarists
Brazilian songwriters
Living people